Kipushi is a town in Haut-Katanga province, Democratic Republic of the Congo.  It lies 35 km southwest of the city of Lubumbashi, very close to the border with Zambia, at an altitude of 1329 m (4363 ft).  The main economic activity of the town is mining. Kipushi is part of the Roman Catholic Diocese of Sakania–Kipushi.

Climate
Kipushi has a humid subtropical climate (Köppen: Cwa).

Kipushi Mine 

The Kipushi Mine (formerly Prince Léopold Mine) produces copper, lead and zinc. Ore occurs in open spaces and collapse breccias along a fault zone. The primary zinc-rich ore body contains the minerals sphalerite, galena, pyrite, and arsenopyrite, accompanied by renierite, and some germanite and gallite. These minerals were overprinted by a formation of mostly copper-rich minerals, including cobalt-bearing chalcopyrite, and
germanium and silver-bearing bornite, plus molybdenite. The ore body is estimated to have contained 70 million tonnes of ore, with an average of 4.8% Cu, 8.8% Zn and 0.5% Pb. From 1925 to 1986 the mine at Kipushi produced 3.8 million tonnes of copper, 5.9 million tonnes of zinc,
0.4 million tonnes of lead, 45,000 tonnes of cadmium, and 120 tonnes of germanium, plus other elements.

Notable residents
Ilunga Mande Zatara - Olympic marathon runner for DR Congo
Mulumba Lukoji - Former Prime Minister of DR Congo

References 

 Höll, R., Kling, M., and Schroll, E., 2007, Metallogenesis of germanium - A review: Ore Geology Reviews, v. 30, p. 145-180.

Populated places in Haut-Katanga Province